Cambridge is a city and the county town of Cambridgeshire, United Kingdom, famous for being the location of the University of Cambridge.

Cambridge may also refer to:

Places

Australia
 Cambridge, Tasmania, a suburb of Hobart
 Town of Cambridge, a Western Australian local government area

Barbados
 Cambridge, Barbados, a populated place in the parish of Saint Joseph, Barbados

Canada
 Cambridge, Ontario, a city in Canada
 Cambridge (electoral district), a federal electoral district corresponding to Cambridge, Ontario
 Cambridge (provincial electoral district), a provincial electoral district corresponding to Cambridge, Ontario

 Cambridge, Hants County, Nova Scotia, a small community in Canada
 Cambridge, Kings County, Nova Scotia, a small community in Canada
 Cambridge Bay, Nunavut, a hamlet in Canada
 Cambridge Parish, New Brunswick, a civil parish in Canada
 Cambridge-Narrows, New Brunswick, a small community in Canada

Jamaica
 Cambridge, Jamaica

Malta
 Cambridge Battery/Fort Cambridge, an artillery battery

New Zealand
 Cambridge, New Zealand

South Africa
 Cambridge, Eastern Cape

United Kingdom
 Cambridge (ward), Southport
 Cambridge, Gloucestershire
 Cambridge, Scottish Borders, a location in the United Kingdom
 Cambridge, West Yorkshire, a location in the United Kingdom
 Cambridge (UK Parliament constituency)
 County of Cambridge, another name for Cambridgeshire
 Cambridge Heath, a place in the London borough of Tower Hamlets
 Cambridge Town (disambiguation) or Camberley, Surrey, England

United States
 Cambridge, Idaho
 Cambridge, Illinois
 Cambridge, Iowa
 Cambridge, Kansas
 Cambridge, Kentucky
 Cambridge, Maine
 Cambridge, Maryland
 Cambridge, Massachusetts
 Cambridge, Minnesota
 Cambridge, Missouri
 Cambridge, Nebraska
 Cambridge, New Hampshire, a township
 Cambridge, Delran, New Jersey
 Cambridge, Evesham, New Jersey
 Cambridge (town), New York
 Cambridge (village), New York
 Cambridge, Ohio
 Cambridge, Vermont
 Cambridge (village), Vermont
 Cambridge, Wisconsin
 Cambridge City, Indiana
 Cambridge Springs, Pennsylvania
 Cambridge Township, Guernsey County, Ohio
 Cambridge Township, Henry County, Illinois
 Cambridge Township, Michigan
 Cambridge Township, Minnesota
 Cambridge Township, Pennsylvania

Extraterrestrial
 2531 Cambridge, a stony Main Belt asteroid in the Solar System

People

Surnames
 Alice Cambridge (1762–1829), early Irish Methodist preacher
 Alyson Cambridge (born 1980), American operatic soprano and classical music, jazz, and American popular song singer
 Asuka Cambridge (born 1993), Japanese sprint athlete
 Barrington Cambridge (born 1957), Guyanese boxer
 Godfrey Cambridge (1933–1976), American stand-up comic and actor
 Richard Owen Cambridge (1717–1802), British poet

Titles
 Duke of Cambridge

Brands and enterprises
 Cambridge (cigarette)
 Cambridge Audio, a manufacturer of audio equipment
 Cambridge Glass, a glass company of Cambridge, Ohio
 Cambridge Scientific Instrument Company, founded 1881 in England 
 Cambridge SoundWorks, a manufacturer of audio equipment
 Cambridge Theatre, a theatre in the West End of London
 Cambridge University Press

Educational institutions
 Cambridge State University, US
 The Cambridge School (disambiguation)
 University of Cambridge, UK

Other uses
 Cambridge (book), 2005 book by Tim Rawle
 Cambridge (ship), four merchant ships
 Austin Cambridge, motor car range produced by the Austin Motor Company
 Cambridge Circus (disambiguation)